Rowland Jones-Bateman (10 November 1826 – 16 December 1896) was an English cricketer active in the 1840s, making eight appearances in first-class cricket. Born at St Pancras, London, Jones-Bateman was a batsman of unknown style who was mostly associated with Oxford University.

Career
The son of John Jones-Bateman, he was educated at Winchester College, before attending New College, Oxford and a student of Lincoln's Inn. While studying at the university, Jones-Bateman played first-class cricket for the university cricket club, debuting against the Marylebone Cricket Club (MCC) in 1846. He made six further first-class appearances for the university, all of which came against the MCC. He scored 84 runs at an average of 6.46, with a high score of 22. He later made a single first-class appearance for the MCC against Oxford University in 1849. Later a member of the Inner Temple, he was called to the bar on 30 April 1852.

He died at Otterbourne, Hampshire on 16 December 1896. His brother John Jones-Bateman also played first-class cricket.

References

External links
Rowland Jones-Bateman at ESPNcricinfo
Rowland Jones-Bateman at CricketArchive

1826 births
1896 deaths
People from St Pancras, London
People educated at Winchester College
Alumni of New College, Oxford
English cricketers
Oxford University cricketers
Marylebone Cricket Club cricketers
Members of Lincoln's Inn
Members of the Inner Temple
English barristers
19th-century English lawyers